Anne Heinis is a Dutch water polo player.

She was part of the Dutch team at the 2009 World Aquatics Championships, 2011 World Aquatics Championships, and 2013 World Aquatics Championships.

References

External links

 884-1107010621

1994 births
Dutch female water polo players
Living people